The  Philadelphia Eagles season was the franchise's 17th season in the National Football League. The Eagles won their second-consecutive NFL championship.

Off season
The Eagles hold training camp for the first time at UM North Central Agriculture school in Grand Rapids, Minnesota.

NFL Draft
The 1949 NFL draft was held on December 21, 1948. It was 25 rounds long. The Eagles had the Lottery Bonus Pick in the draft and picked 1st. The Eagles chose 26 players total during this draft. They had the last pick in each round as all teams picked in every round. The All-America Football Conference, a rival league signed some of the NFL cast offs and draft picks.
With the bonus and 1st pick overall, the Eagles took a local hero from the University of Pennsylvania, a center and linebacker,  Chuck Bednarik.
Along with him, the other future NFL Hall of Famers picked this year were Norm Van Brocklin, George Blanda, and Doak Walker.

Player selections
The table shows the Eagles selections and what picks they had that were traded away and the team that ended up with that pick. It is possible the Eagles' pick ended up with this team via another team that the Eagles made a trade with.
Not shown are acquired picks that the Eagles traded away.

Regular season

Schedule

Note: Intra-division opponents are in bold text.

Game recaps

Week 4 at Chi Bears 
The Eagles get the only loss of the season against the Chicago Bears in a game played at Wrigley Field in Chicago. The last points of the game were made by 22 years 29 days old George Blanda. Blanda would score his last points against Philadelphia in his career 22 years and 1 day later on October 17, 1971. Also a placekicker, Blanda had one of the longest pro football careers, a total of 26 years.

NFL Championship Game

Standings

Roster
(All time List of Philadelphia Eagles players in franchise history)

Postseason
The NFL and the AAFC agree to form one league as the NFL. The Philadelphia Eagles are scheduled to meet the AAFC 4 time Champion Cleveland Browns on the 1950 opening weekend in Philadelphia.

Awards and honors
All-Star Selections
Pete Pihos  is selected as 1st team End – Defensive End.
Steve Van Buren is selected as 1st team Halfback

League Leaders
Eagles Lead NFL as Overall Offensive Team.
Eagles Lead NFL as Overall Defensive Team.
Tommy Thompson finishes 2nd in Pass Completion Pct. with a .542 (214 attempts/116 completions)
Tommy Thompson leads in Passer Rating with an 84.4 rating
Steve Van Buren leads Rushing Attempts with 263
Steve Van Buren leads Rushing Yardage with 1,146 at the time an NFL record for season.
Bosh Pritchard leads in Rushing Yards per Attempts Avg. with 6.0 (84 rushes/506 yards 3 td)
Steve Van Buren leads Rushing Touchdowns with 11
Cliff Patton leads league with Field Goals with 9 (on 18 attempts)
Cliff Patton finishes 2nd in league on Field Goal Attempts with 18
Frank Reagan and Clyde Scott are 2nd in Punt Returns for TDs with 1 each.
Pat Mchugh and Joe Muha finishes 2nd in Interceptions Returned for TD with 1 each.

References

External links
 Eagles on Pro Football Reference
 Eagles on jt-sw.com

National Football League championship seasons
Philadelphia Eagles seasons
Philadelphia Eagles
Philadelphia